Argyrotaenia rufina is a species of moth of the family Tortricidae. It is found in Peru.

The wingspan is about 18.5 mm. The ground colour of the forewings is cream ferruginous, tinged with greyish in the middle posteriorly and strigulated (finely streaked) with ferruginous. The hindwings are dark grey-brown, but paler basally.

Etymology
The species name refers to the colouration of the costa of the forewings and is derived from Latin rufus (meaning rust).

References

External links

Moths described in 2010
rufina
Moths of South America